Lidiya Petrovna Tseraskaya née Shelekhova (Russian: Лидия Петровна Цераская) (22 June 1855 – 24 December 1931) was a Russian astronomer.

Tseraskaya was born in Astrakhan, and graduated from the Teacher's Institute in Petersberg. She worked at the Moscow Observatory, where she discovered 219 variable stars; among them (1905) RV Tauri variable and recognized its uniqueness. The Venusian crater Tseraskaya was named after her. Her academic papers were published under her husband's name, "W. Ceraski".

Tseraskaya was married to Vitold Tserasky (1849–1925), also known as Vitol'd Karlovic Tseraskiy or Witold Ceraski, who was Professor of Astronomy as Moscow University and director at the Moscow Observatory , after whom asteroid 807 Ceraskia and lunar crater Tseraskiy were named.

References

External links 
 Lidiya Tseraskaya, Soviet astronomer (1855–1931), Biographical Encyclopedia of Astronomers

1855 births
1931 deaths
Russian astronomers
19th-century people from the Russian Empire